Cipanas is a village in Cipanas, Lebak Regency, Banten, Indonesia. On 2017 the population of the village is 4.236.

References

lebak Regency
villages in Indonesia
populated places in Banten